Skeidshornet Peak is a peak, 2,725 m, standing 5 nautical miles (9 km) west-southwest of Mount Valikhanov in the Pieck Range of the Petermann Ranges, in Queen Maud Land. Discovered and plotted from air photos by German Antarctic Expedition, 1938–39. Replotted from air photos and surveys by Norwegian Antarctic Expedition, 1956–60, and named Skeidshornet.

Mountains of Queen Maud Land
Princess Astrid Coast